Sekolah Kebangsaan Bukit Rimau (shortened as SK Bukit Rimau or SKBR), is a public primary school which is located in Bukit Rimau, Shah Alam, Selangor, Malaysia. As of 2019, this school holds more than 1900 students from around Kota Kemuning, Bukit Rimau and west of Jalan Kebun area.

History
Sekolah Kebangsaan Bukit Rimau started in the year 2004 with 19 students and 10 teachers. Over the years the school has grown to over 1900 students in the year 2019.

See also

List of schools in Selangor
Lists of schools in Malaysia
Education in Malaysia

School Anthem 

The school anthem was written by Md Latif Bin Md Bajuri.

Lyrics

Berdiri megah lagi perkasa,

Bagai seorang wira terbilang,.

Pantang berundur walau dipaksa,

Selagi hasrat belum dijulang.

Kamulah wadah perjuangan,

Untuk kami timba pengetahuan,

Kekalkan ukhuwah serta perpaduan,

Moga berjaya sepanjang zaman.

Bakti gurumu penuh kemuliaan,

Membakar semangat bangsa berdaulat,

Limpahan budi nadi kemerdekaan,

Kanku genggam sebagai azimat.

SK Bukit Rimau teguh berwawasan,

Sentiasa yang terbaik jadi pegangan,

Berani menempuh sebarang cabaran,

Kami pewaris generasi gemilang.

Former Headmasters

References

External links 
 

Primary schools in Malaysia
Publicly funded schools in Malaysia